This is list of Italian explorers and navigators in alphabetical order:

Giuseppe Acerbi (1773-1846)
Enrico Alberto d'Albertis (1846-1932)
Carlo Amoretti (1741–1816)
Paolo Andreani (1763-1823)
Orazio Antinori (1811-1882)
Giosafat Barbaro (1413–1494)
Giacomo Beltrami (1779–1855)
Scipione Borghese (1871-1927)
Vittorio Bottego (1860-1897)
Giacomo Bove (1852-1887)
Sebastiano Caboto (1474–1557)
Umberto Cagni (1863-1932)
Giovanni Caboto (1450–1500)
Alvise Cadamosto (1432–1483)
Gaetano Casati (1838–1902)
Giuseppe Castiglione (1688–1766)
Cristoforo Colombo (1451–1506)
Ambrogio Contarini (1429–1499)
Niccolò de' Conti (1395–1469)
Andrea Corsali (1487-?)
Antonio da Noli (1418-1496)
Giovanni da Pian del Carpine (1185–1252)
Ardito Desio (1897–2001)
Alfonso de Tonti (1659-1727)
Enrico de Tonti (1649-1704)
Andrea Doria (1466-1560)
Eusebio Kino (1645-1711)
Alessandro Malaspina (1754-1810)
Lancelotto Malocello (1269-1335)
Reinhold Messner (born 1944)
Umberto Nobile (1885-1978)
Antonio Pigafetta (1491-1530)
Emanuele Piloti
Marco Polo (c. 1253-1323)
Niccolò and Maffeo Polo (c. 1230 – c. 1294, c. 1230 – c. 1309)
Michele Pontrandolfo (born 1971)
Matteo Ricci (1552-1610)
Prince Luigi Amedeo, Duke of the Abruzzi (1873-1933)
Pietro Paolo Savorgnan di Brazzà (1852-1905)
Giovanni da Verrazzano (1484-1527)
Amerigo Vespucci (1454-1512)
Ugolino Vivaldi (fl. 1291)
Vadino Vivaldi (fl. 1291)

Notes 

Explorers
Italian